Millers Brook is a watercourse in Greater Manchester and tributary of the River Roch. It originates in Heywood and flows through Queens Park to join the River Roch.

Tributaries
 Roeacre Brook

Rivers of the Metropolitan Borough of Rochdale
Heywood, Greater Manchester
1